Samba is an album by the popular Cantopop group, Twins, released in June, 2005.

Track listing
 "Happy Red, White, Blue" (快樂紅白藍)
 咖啡迷 
 黑色喜劇
 "Hot Pink" (熱粉紅)
 "Samba Queen" Cantonese version (森巴皇后 廣東版)
 "Buoy" (救生圈)
 紅睡星
 狂想曲
 "Two Weeks" (兩星期)
 一點一滴
 "Samba" Mandarin version (森巴 國語版)

2005 albums
Twins (group) albums